Hydrophilization is a process used for hydrophobic drugs to increase their release rate from capsules, which is dependent on the rate of dissolution, by covering the surface of the drug particles with minute droplets of a hydrophilic polymer solution.

Method
The process is accomplished by vigorous mixing of the hydrophobic drug with the aqueous solution of the hydrophilic polymer solution, leading to production of small particles of the drug covered with small droplets of the hydrophilic polymer solution.

Uses
This process in tablet or capsule formulations enhance the disintegration of the drug/excipient bulk and so enhance the rate of dissolution of the hydrophobic drug.

Examples of the hydrophilic polymers are methyl cellulose and hydroxyethyl cellulose.

References

Dosage forms